Canal 12 is a nationwide terrestrial television channel in Nicaragua owned by Nicavisión, S.A., a company of the Valle Peters family. It broadcasts from a main transmitter atop Las Nubes, a major broadcast television site for the Managua area, and from repeaters at Estelí, Matagalpa and Jinotega.

History

Nicavisión was founded in 1993 and signed on the air December 11, 1994.

Nicavisión is also the owner of a local network of radio stations, including Radio Amor, Radio Sonora, Estación X, Radio Magic and 106.7 FM.

During the 2018–2022 Nicaraguan protests, TELCOR, the broadcasting regulatory agency in Nicaragua, ordered cable providers to remove Canal 12 and several other stations that were providing news coverage of the demonstrations from their cable systems.

References

External links 
 

Television stations in Nicaragua
Spanish-language television stations
Television channels and stations established in 1994